The 9th Armored Division (the "Phantom Division") was an armored division of the United States Army during World War II. In honor of their World War II service, the 9th was officially nicknamed the "Phantom Division."

The 9th Armored Division was cited for extraordinary heroism and gallantry in combat in the vicinity of Waldbillig and Savelborn, Luxembourg from 16–22 December 1944 during which they repulsed constant and determined attacks by an entire German division. Outnumbered five to one, with its infantry rifle companies surrounded for most of the time, clerks, cooks, mechanics, drivers and others manned the  final defensive line.   Supported by the outstandingly responsive and accurate fire of its artillery battalion, this widely dispersed force stopped every attack for six days until its surrounded infantry were ordered to fight their way back to them. This staunch defense disrupted the precise German attack schedule and thus gave time for the United States III and XII Corps to assemble unhindered and then launch the coordinated attack which raised the siege of Bastogne and contributed to saving much of Luxembourg and its capital from another German invasion. They were awarded the Presidential Unit Citation for their heroism.

History

Predecessor units and early history

The 3rd Cavalry Brigade, 15th Cavalry Division was constituted in the Regular Army on 29 August 1917 and was organized in December 1917 at Camp Harry J. Jones, Arizona. It was demobilized on 15 July 1919. Because of a reduced table of organization for the cavalry division developed after the war, the 3rd Cavalry Brigade became a part of the new 2nd Cavalry Division. On 15 July 1942, the 9th Armored Division, under the command of Major General Geoffrey Keyes, was activated at Fort Riley, Kansas, by reorganizing and redesignating the white elements of the 2nd Cavalry Division. This was only seven months after the Japanese attack on Pearl Harbor on 7 December 1941, which was followed just four days later by the German declaration of war on the United States, thus bringing the United States into World War II. Headquarters, 3rd Cavalry Brigade was converted, reorganized, and redesignated as Headquarters, 9th Armored Division Trains. The  2nd and 14th Cavalry Regiments were inactivated and the personnel and equipment were transferred to the new 2nd and 14th Armored Regiments, respectively.

The regiments underwent changes during the war as follows:

 2nd Armored Regiment reorganized and redesignated 9 October 1943:
 Headquarters, Headquarters Company, and 2nd Battalion reorganized and redesignated as 2nd Tank Battalion, 9th Armored Division. 
 1st Battalion reorganized and redesignated as 776th Tank Battalion and relieved from assignment to the 9th Armored Division.
 3rd Battalion reorganized and redesignated as 19th Tank Battalion, 9th Armored Division.
 Reconnaissance Company reorganized and redesignated as Troop D, 89th Cavalry Reconnaissance Squadron, 9th Armored Division.
 Band, Maintenance Company, and Service Company disbanded. 

 14th Armored Regiment reorganized and redesignated 9 October 1943:
 Headquarters, Headquarters Company, and 1st and 2nd Battalions reorganized and redesignated as 14th Tank Battalion, 9th Armored Division.
 3rd Battalion reorganized and redesignated as 711th Tank Battalion and relieved from assignment to the 9th Armored Division.
 Reconnaissance Company reorganized and redesignated as Troop E, 89th Cavalry Reconnaissance Squadron, 9th Armored Division.
 Band, Maintenance Company, and Service Company disbanded.

The lineages of the 2nd and 14th Cavalry Regiments were continued when these inactive units, having given up their personnel and equipment, were later reorganized and redesignated as cavalry reconnaissance squadrons and reactivated in 1943.

After over two years of training throughout the country, including Camp Ibis, the 9th Armored Division, now commanded by Major General John W. Leonard, reached the United Kingdom in September 1944.

Fortitude

The 9th Armored Division was one of several real U.S. Army divisions that participated in Operation Fortitude, the deception operation mounted by the Allies to deceive the Germans about the real landing site for Operation Neptune, the amphibious invasion of Northern France. The 9th was assigned to a camp on the British coastline opposite of the German defenses in Pas-de-Calais, ostensibly as part of the "First US Army Group" (FUSAG) under Major General John W. Leonard.

Combat chronicle

The 9th Armored Division landed in Normandy late in September 1944, and first went into line, 23 October 1944, on patrol duty in a quiet sector along the Luxembourg-German frontier. When the Germans launched their winter offensive on 16 December 1944, the 9th, with no real combat experience, suddenly found itself engaged in heavy fighting. The Division saw its severest action at St. Vith, Echternach, and Bastogne, its units fighting in widely separated areas.

Its stand at Bastogne held off the Germans long enough to enable the 101st Airborne Division to dig in for a defense of the city. After a rest period in January 1945, the Division prepared to drive across the Roer River. The offensive was launched on 28 February 1945 and the 9th crossed the Roer to Rheinbach, sending patrols into Remagen. 

"Here, on the Ludendorf Bridge crossing the Rhine at Remagen, Combat Command B, 9th Armored Division -- headed by the 27th Armored Infantry Battalion -- with 'superb skill, daring and esprit de corps' successfully effected the first bridgehead across Germany's formidable river barrier and so contributed decisively to the defeat of the enemy. The 27th Battalion reached Remagen, found the bridge intact but mined for demolition. Although its destruction was imminent, without hesitation and in face of heavy fire the infantrymen rushed across the structure, and with energy and skill seized the surrounding high ground. The entire episode illustrates that high degree of initiative, leadership and gallantry toward which all armies strive but too rarely attain, and won for the Combat Command the Distinguished Unit Citation."

On 7 March 1945, elements of the 9th Armored captured the Ludendorff Bridge when German demolition charges failed to bring the bridge down. Soldiers scrambled under the bridge, swinging from girder to girder,  tossing demolition charges into the Rhine, fearing the chargers could explode at any time. Capturing the bridge may have shortened the war by weeks to months  and saved tens of thousands of lives.

The Division exploited the bridgehead, moving south and east across the Lahn River toward Limburg, where thousands of Allied prisoners were liberated from Stalag XIIA. The Division drove on to Frankfurt and then turned to assist in the closing of the Ruhr Pocket. In April it continued east, encircling Leipzig and securing a line along the Mulde River. The Division was shifting south to Czechoslovakia when the war in Europe ended on 9 May 1945.

Activated: 15 July 1942.
Overseas: 26 August 1944.
Campaigns: Rhineland, Ardennes-Alsace, Central Europe.
Days of Combat: 91.
Distinguished Unit Citations: 11.

Commanders:

Maj. Gen. Geoffrey Keyes (June to September 1942)
Maj. Gen. John W. Leonard (October 1942 to inactivation).

Returned to U.S.: 10 October 1945.
Inactivated: 13 October 1945.

Casualties
Total battle casualties: 3,845
Killed in action: 570
Wounded in action: 2,280
Missing in action:  87
Prisoner of war:  908

Awards for valor

Individual awards 

Medal of Honor: 1
Distinguished Service Cross: 1
Distinguished Service Medal: 2
Silver Star: 191
Legion of Merit: 13
Soldier's Medal: 11
Bronze Star: 1,263
Air Medal: 28

Unit award

All units of CCB/9 AIB of the 9th Armored Division were awarded the Presidential Unit Citation for their actions in taking and defending the Ludendorff Bridge during the Battle of Remagen in World War II.

Composition 
The division was composed of the following units:

 Headquarters
 Headquarters Company
 Combat Command A
 Combat Command B
 Combat Command Reserve
 2nd Tank Battalion
 14th Tank Battalion
 19th Tank Battalion
 27th Armored Infantry Battalion
 52nd Armored Infantry Battalion
 60th Armored Infantry Battalion
 Headquarters and Headquarters Battery, 9th Armored Division Artillery
 3rd Armored Field Artillery Battalion
 16th Armored Field Artillery Battalion
 73rd Armored Field Artillery Battalion
 89th Cavalry Reconnaissance Squadron (Mechanized)
 9th Armored Engineer Battalion
 149th Armored Signal Company
 Headquarters and Headquarters Company, 9th Armored Division Trains
 131st Armored Ordnance Maintenance Battalion
 2nd Armored Medical Battalion
 Military Police Platoon
 Band 

Temporarily attached units:
 656th Tank Destroyer Battalion (attached 22 February 1945 past 9 May 1945)
 811th Tank Destroyer Battalion (attached 14 November 1944 to 8 January 1945)
 482nd AAA Automatic Weapons Battalion (attached 22 November 1944 to 9 January 1945; 22 February 1945 to 9 May 1945)

Ancestor units
The 3rd Brigade, 1st Cavalry Division, was constituted on 29 August 1917 and organized as Headquarters, 3rd Brigade, 15th Cavalry Division in December. The 3rd Brigade demobilized on 15 July 1919 and reconstituted on 10 August 1921, within the newly constituted 1st Cavalry Division. Although never officially reorganized, the Brigade was inactive until its 15 October 1940 activation and redesignation and conversion to HHC, 9th Armored Division Trains, and deployed to Europe, receiving campaign-participation credit for operations in the Rhineland, the Ardennes-Alsace, and the Central Europe theatres of war, and awarded two Meritorious Unit Commendations, with embroidered streamers reading: Europe 1944 and Europe 1945.

Inactivation 

After World War II, the unit returned state-side. The division was inactivated on 13 October 1945, and reactivated on 15 July 1963, when it was reassigned from the 9th Armored Division, and converted and redesignated as HHC, 3rd Brigade, 1st Cavalry Division (United States).

References

External links
The 9th: The Story of the 9th Armored Division (World War II unit history booklet)
"Official 3d Brigade Combat Team, 1st Cavalry Division Homepage"
Fact Sheet of the 9th Armored Division from http://www.battleofthebulge.org

09th Amored Division, U.S.
Armored Division, U.S. 09th
Military units and formations established in 1942
1942 establishments in the United States
1942 establishments in Kansas
Military units and formations disestablished in 1945